Catseye is a 1961 science fiction novel by American writer Andre Norton. It tells the story of a boy living as a member of the underclass in  the "Dipple", a deprived part of a colony on a distant planet, who discovers an ancient secret that changes his life. Catseye is the first of Norton's Dipple series of novels. The other novels in the Dipple series are Judgment on Janus (1963), Night of Masks (1964), and Forerunner Foray (1973).

Plot summary
Troy Horan manages to find work in a luxury pet shop on his repressive planet when he learns he can communicate telepathically with the animals – notably a kinkajou and some exotic Terran cats. He uncovers a conspiracy resulting in the death of the owner and flees to the dangerous Wilds with the animals. After crashing in ancient, forbidden ruins, he finds the remains of the explorers that had previously attempted to enter the ruins along with a mysterious machine that can summon the past into the present. The aforementioned machine is heavily implied to have been the cause of the explorer's deaths.

References

1961 American novels
Novels by Andre Norton
American science fiction novels
1961 science fiction novels
Novels set on fictional planets
Novels about animals
Novels about cats
Books with cover art by Richard M. Powers